Andrew David Phillips (born 10 October 1968) is a former speedway rider from England.

Speedway career 
Phillips reached the final of the British Speedway Championship in 1989. He rode in the top tier of British Speedway from 1986 to 1992, riding for various clubs.

References 

Living people
1968 births
British speedway riders
Coventry Bees riders
Cradley Heathens riders
Poole Pirates riders
Wolverhampton Wolves riders